The 2008 Total 24 Hours of Spa was the fifth round of the 2008 FIA GT Championship season.  It took place at Circuit de Spa-Francorchamps, Belgium, on 2  – 3 August 2008.

Half-point Leaders
In the FIA GT Championship (using the GT1 and GT2 classes), the top eight teams at the six-hour mark as well as the midway point of the race are awarded points towards the championship.  Points for the top eight go in the order of 5 – 4 – 3 – 2.5 – 2 – 1.5 – 1 – 0.5.

6 Hour Leaders in GT1

6 Hour Leaders in GT2

12 Hour Leaders in GT1

12 Hour Leaders in GT2

Race results
Class winners in bold.  Cars failing to complete 75% of winner's distance marked as Not Classified (NC).

Statistics
 Pole Position – #7 Larbre Compétition – 2:13.923
 Average Speed – 168.07 km/h
 Total Distance – 4041.885 km

References

Spa
Spa 24 Hours
Spa 24 Hours